Gerardus Cornelius (Sjra) Schoffelen (Roosteren, 1 August 1937) is a Dutch sculptor.

Schoffelen studied at the Maastricht Institute of Arts (1953-1957) and the Jan van Eyck Academie (1958–1962) in Maastricht and the Staatliche Hochschule für Bildende Künste in Berlin (1962–1964). He was a student of Fred Carasso and Bernhard Heiliger, among others. In 1969 he won the Henriëtte Hustinx Prize.

Schoffelen was a teacher at the Katholieke Leergangen in Tilburg (1970–1979) and the Academy of Visual Arts in Maastricht (1971–1990). As a sculptor he produced fountain statues, portraits and free sculptures, often abstract from an organic point of view. He joined the Beroepsvereniging van Beeldende Kunstenaars and the Nederlandse Kring van Beeldhouwers. Schoffelen lives and works in the Etzenraderhuuske near Jabeek.

In 2019 a book celebrating his 60 years as an artist was published.

Works in the public space (selection) 

 Afsluitpaal met haringen (1955), Maastricht
 Sint Joris te paard (1956), Maastricht
 Moeder en kind (1971), Lelystad
 Grijpende vormen (1980), Dronten
 Relatie (1987), Onze Lieve Vrouweplein, Maastricht
 Zonnevogel (1998), Horst
 Relatie (1999), Roosteren
 Carnavalsbeeld (2010), Buchten
 Relatie I (2013), Meerssen
 Koningsvogelschieten, Venray
 Torso, Eindhoven

References

1937 births
Living people
Dutch male sculptors
People from Echt-Susteren